is a single by the Japanese idol group Momoiro Clover Z and American rock band Kiss, credited to "Momoiro Clover Z vs. Kiss". It was released physically in Japan on January 28, 2015.

Background 
Before the collaboration, the members of Kiss watched the concert videos of Momoiro Clover Z. Later, Paul Stanley gave his impressions in an interview:

The guitar solo on the single's B-side, a cover of "Rock and Roll All Nite", was performed by Shinji Wajima of Ningen Isu.

A commercial success, it peaked at number one on Japan's Oricon daily singles chart, and at number two on its weekly singles chart.

Music video 
The music video features live action and animated footage of both bands. Momoiro Clover Z are dressed as female ninjas who travel in a floating world. There, they encounter Kiss, who empower them with black samurai armor. The video ends with Kanako Momota and Paul Stanley shaking hands.

Track listing

Momoclo Edition (CD+Blu-ray)

KISS Edition (CD only)

Charts

References

External links 
 "Yume no Ukiyo ni Saitemina" in Momoiro Clover Z discography
 

2015 singles
2015 songs
Japanese-language songs
Momoiro Clover Z songs
Kiss (band) songs
King Records (Japan) singles